The Rival Queens, or the Death Of Alexander the Great is a Restoration tragedy written by Nathaniel Lee . Regarded as one of his best tragedies, the play revolves around Alexander the Great and his two wives, Roxana and Statira, whose competition for his affections ends in tragedy. The play was largely influenced by French dramatist La Calprenède's historic romance Cassandre.

Performance history 
The play was first performed at the Theatre Royal in London by the King's Company. The original cast included Charles Hart as Alexander, Michael Mohun as Clytus, Philip Griffin as Lysimachus, Thomas Clark as  Hephestion, Cardell Goodman as  Polyperchon, Edward Kynaston as Cassander, Martin Powell as Philip, John Wiltshire as Thessalus, Edward Lydall as Perdiccas, Marmaduke Watson as  Eumenes, Carey Perin as  Meleager, John Coysh as Aristander, Katherine Corey as Sysigambis, Elizabeth Boutell as Statira and Anne Marshall as Roxana.

Footnotes

Bibliography
 Van Lennep, W. The London Stage, 1660-1800: Volume One, 1660-1700. Southern Illinois University Press, 1960.

English Restoration plays
Plays by Nathaniel Lee
Tragedy plays
Plays set in ancient Greece
Cultural depictions of Alexander the Great
West End plays
Plays set in the 4th century BC